Cheaper by the Dozen is a 2022 American family-comedy film directed by Gail Lerner (in her feature directorial debut) from a screenplay written by Kenya Barris and Jenifer Rice-Genzuk Henry, with Shawn Levy serving as an executive producer. It is the third film adaptation of the 1948 semi-autobiographical novel of the same name by Frank Bunker Gilbreth Jr. and his sister Ernestine Gilbreth Carey following the 1950 and 2003 films. The film stars Gabrielle Union, Zach Braff, Erika Christensen, and Timon Kyle Durratt with supporting roles by Christian Cote, Sebastian Cote, Christina Anthony, Caylee Blosenski, Journey Brown, Brittany Daniel, Mykal-Michelle Harris, Cynthia Daniel Hauser, Abby Elliott, Ron Funches, Leo Abelo Perry, Luke Prael, June Diane Raphael, Andre Robinson, Kylie Rogers, and Aryan Simhadri. It tells the story of a restaurant proprietor and his second wife as they raise the kids from the restaurateur's previous marriage, the second wife's family, and the children they later conceived as their respectful exes are still involved in their children's life.

Produced by Walt Disney Pictures, Cheaper by the Dozen had its world premiere at the El Capitan Theatre on March 16, 2022, and was released on Disney+ on March 18. The film was met with mixed reviews.

Plot

The Bakers are a blended family that began with Paul Baker and his wife Kate who together had daughters Ella and Harley. They had friends who died in a car accident causing them to take in their godson Haresh. Kate eventually divorced Paul, but they remained friends with Kate acting as an occasional, though slightly inattentive, babysitter.

Zoey married football player Dominic "Dom" Clayton and had daughter Deja and son DJ. Due to Dom's celebrity life, Zoey divorced him and took custody of the kids. Paul met Zoey after she visited his small restaurant and suggested that he make the entire menu breakfast themed all day. The two eventually got married, expanded the restaurant, renamed it Baker's Breakfast and had two sets of twins: Luca and Luna, and Bronx and Bailey.

Dom continues to be active in Deja and DJ's lives which slightly intimidates Paul as he was rarely there to begin with. While Deja prepares for her basketball scholarship to the University of Southern California, DJ feels that he connects with Paul more than Dom and would rather speak with him. Paul gets a meeting with a large company to expand his restaurant. He succeeds and has his famous sauce sold on shelves. He decides to use the money to move the family and their dogs Bark Obama and Joe Bitin' from Los Angeles to Calabasas, in a bigger house in a gated community.

Upon arrival, Zoey begins to feel the effects of racial profiling, especially after meeting her neighbor Anne. Paul suddenly gets a call informing him that his sister Rachel has checked into rehab, forcing him to take in his nephew Seth, who has had a habit of being a thief. Seth bonds with Haresh when he discovers that he is being picked on at the new school because of his ethnicity and teaches him to defend himself while making monster spray for his younger cousins. While not being used a lot on the Calabasa Hornets basketball team, Deja begins seeing a boy named Chris and sneaks out of the house to see him.

Paul finds himself having to travel to look for new places to expand his restaurant. The investors Melanie and Michele also insist on altering some of his business ideals to cut costs. He starts to miss out on being with his family which upsets Zoey as this was the reason she divorced Dom. Haresh and Seth are suspended from school for a week after starting a fight with the kids who bullied Haresh causing Zoey to ground them. On DJ's birthday, Paul rushes to get home. During the party, things start to get out of hand as DJ changes his look to impress a girl. Anne profiles Zoey's family for a series of recent break-ins. Upon Paul arriving, Deja reveals that she quit the basketball team and that the entire family has been unhappy since arriving in Calabasas. Feeling that Zoey can no longer handle their kids, Dom announces that he wants full custody of Deja and DJ.

Harley and Ella accuse Seth of the break-ins after Haresh pointed out that he saw him stealing from the restaurant cash register, though he returned it and he angrily leaves. After telling Paul and Zoey they explain the money is from DCFS and they have been giving it to Seth and that someone broke into Anne house during the party while Seth was grounded. Upon realizing their mistake, the Bakers, Kate, and Dom all go out and find Seth. They apologize and admit that he is part of the family and he rejoins them.

Back at home, Paul and Dom discuss their different upbringings. While Paul will never know what it is like to be at a disadvantage, Dom has to understand that being away from his kids has made him distant and that he needs to be more attentive. Realizing how much his family means to him, Paul breaks his deal with the company so that he can run the restaurant himself. The Bakers move back to Los Angeles and buy a new house while the children returned to their old schools as Deja returns to the Elysian Park Wildcats which beat the Calabasa Hornets. While having breakfast for dinner at the newly named Baker's Dozen Breakfast, Paul reveals the design of the sauce bottle has changed to reflect the entire family.

A postscript states that Dom, Paul, and Zoey were able to invest their sauce and went national. Kate invented bird yoga which only birds liked. Seth moved back in with his mom after she got out of rehab, but still spends lots of time with his cousins who haven't had any monster problems since. Deja and Chris soon started their freshman years at USC. Ella became the social manager for Harley's punk band and a video of her band playing at her school talent show broke the internet. Luna and Luca won the tennis national under 12 division becoming like Venus and Serena. DJ, Talia, and Dom went to Comic-Con and bonded while Dom realized he liked Thor.

Cast

Also in the film are the Baker family's pet Rottweiler Bark Obama and the chihuahua Joe Bitin' who are named after Barack Obama and Joe Biden where they are portrayed by two uncredited dog actors.

Production
In 2016, it was reported that Kenya Barris would work with 20th Century Fox on a remake of Cheaper by the Dozen. On August 6, 2019, following the acquisition of 21st Century Fox by Disney, Disney CEO Bob Iger announced that a reboot of Cheaper by the Dozen was in development and that it would premiere on the company's streaming service, Disney+. Gail Lerner was set to direct the film with a script co-written by Kenya Barris and Jenifer Rice-Genzuk Henry. Lerner had worked for Barris as a writer on the television series Black-ish and appreciated that he saw her not only as a writer but also a director. Principal photography was scheduled to commence on July 13, 2020, in Los Angeles, California. After filming was halted due to the COVID-19 pandemic, Disney's new CEO Bob Chapek announced that filming had resumed in November 2020. The film was revealed at the Disney Investors Day, along with the casting of Gabrielle Union.

In January 2021, Zach Braff joined the cast. In February 2021, Journee Brown, Kylie Rogers, Andre Robinson, Caylee Blosenski, Aryan Simhaldri, Leo Abelo Perry, Mykal-Michelle Harris, Christian Cote, Sebastian Cote, and Luke Prael joined the cast as the pair's children. Erika Christensen would be added to the cast in April. Filming had begun in Los Angeles by April 2021.

Shawn Levy, who previously directed the 2003 film adaptation, was confirmed in 2021 to be an executive producer on the film.

Lerner thought it was important to adjust the film to accommodate the actors, and not have young performers speaking lines or expressions that did not come across as natural for them. Lerner said Zoey is the heart of the film, she praised Union for not falling into tropes or stereotypes, and not wanting to be pigeonholed as the stern mom and the finger-wagger. Union also served as an executive producer.

Music
John Paesano composed the musical score. The soundtrack was released on March 18, 2022, by Hollywood Records and Walt Disney Records.

Release
On November 12, 2021, the film was revealed to be released in March 2022. On February 7, 2022, with the release of the official trailer, it was revealed that it would be digitally released on March 18, 2022, on Disney+. The film had its world premiere at the El Capitan Theatre on March 16.

Reception

Audience viewership 
According to Whip Media, Cheaper by the Dozen was the 5th most streamed movie across all platforms, in the United States, during the week of March 18, 2022 to March 20, 2022.

Critical response 
 

Variety stated: "Despite some of this movie’s missteps, the heart behind its messages is in the right place. Sentiments dealing with co-parenting after divorce and prioritizing family above monetary success may seem old fashioned on the surface. Yet it goes deeper, exploring and challenging our societal system’s gross inequities and injustices in a thoughtful, meaningful manner." IGN rated the movie 6 out of 10, stating, "Disney's latest reboot of Cheaper by the Dozen, starring Zach Braff and Gabrielle Union, can be as haphazard as its premise." The Guardian rated the movie 3 out of 5 stars, stating, "As with the 2003 film, the gist of Disney Plus’s remake is cheerful domestic chaos molded into light didacticism: the importance of the nuclear family (albeit a blended one, in this update) with reminders to not get blinded by financial success or the lure of growth." Screen Rant gave the movie 2.5 out of 5 stars, saying "Cheaper by the Dozen is a fluffy family drama that ultimately doesn’t amount to anything. [...]  It is great that this blended family is so diverse, but if there is no thoughtful integration of their stories, they remain merely set dressing."

Notes

References

External links
 
 
 

2022 films
2022 comedy films
2022 directorial debut films
2020s children's comedy films
2020s English-language films
20th Century Studios films
21 Laps Entertainment films
American children's comedy films
Disney+ original films
Films about families
Films about parenting
Films based on adaptations
Films scored by John Paesano
Films set in Los Angeles
Films set in the San Fernando Valley
Films shot in Los Angeles
Remakes of American films
Walt Disney Pictures films
2020s American films